Beer & Sex & Chips n Gravy was the second full-length album from irreverent English punk rock band, The Macc Lads. It was released in 1985 and follows the self-produced debut album, Eh Up, from 1983. Bitter, Fit Crack was the third album, appearing in 1987.
Track number 11, Nagasaki Sauce has been adopted by Macclesfield Cricket Club, as their 'victory song'.

Track listing
All songs written by Hatton, O'Neill, and Conning
"The Lads From Macc"	–	2:21
"Beer & Sex & Chips 'n' Gravy"	–	2:15
"Boddies"	–	1:19
"Sweaty Betty"	–	2:11
"England's Glory"	–	2:21
"Blackpool"	–	2:27
"Miss Macclesfield"	–	2:51
"God's Gift To Women"	–	2:12
"Get Weavin'"	–	2:06
"Now He's A Poof"	–	2:35
"Nagasaki Sauce"	–	2:28
"Saturday Night"	–	2:35
"Buenos Aires"	–	2:30
"Charlotte"	–	3:52
"Failure With Girls"	–	2:24
"Do You Love Me?"	–	2:13
"Dan's Underpant"	–	2:44
"Twenty Pints"	–	1:46
"The Macc Lads' Party"	–	3:19

Credits
 Muttley McLad – vocals, bass
 The Beater – guitar
 Stez Styx – drums
 Chorley The Hord is credited as drummer on the Snapper Music CD releases
 Recorded at The Cottage, Macclesfield, England
 Produced and engineered by Bald Eagle

External links
Macc Lads official discography

1985 albums
Macc Lads albums